Encrucijada is a municipality and town in the Villa Clara Province of Cuba. It was founded in 1850 and established as a municipality in 1910.

History
The municipality was divided into the barrios of Centro, Paso Real, El Santo and Vega Redonda. After the 1977 administrative reform, Calabazar de Sagua, part of Sagua la Grande, became part of it.

Geography
The municipality borders with Sagua la Grande, Cifuentes, Santa Clara and Camajuaní. It includes the villages and popular councils of Encrucijada Norte, Encrucijada Sur, Arroyo Naranjo, Calabazar de Sagua, Constancia (Abel Santamaría), El Chivo, El Perico, El Purio (Perucho Figueredo), El Santo, Emilio Córdova, La Sierra, Piñón, Playa Nazabal, Playa Piñón and San Francisco.

Demographics
In 2004, the municipality of Encrucijada had a population of 33,641.

Notable people
Onelio Jorge Cardoso (1914-1986), writer, born in Calabazar
 (1911-1948), trade unionist and politician
Abel Santamaría Cuadrado (1927-1953), revolutionary, born in Constancia
Haydée Santamaría Cuadrado (1922-1980), revolutionary, born in Constancia

See also
Municipalities of Cuba
List of cities in Cuba

References

External links

Populated places in Villa Clara Province

1850 establishments in North America
Populated places established in 1850
1850 establishments in the Spanish Empire